The 5 '''arrondissements of the Saône-et-Loire department are:
 Arrondissement of Autun, (subprefecture: Autun) with 89 communes. The population of the arrondissement was 131,392 in 2016.  
 Arrondissement of Chalon-sur-Saône, (subprefecture: Chalon-sur-Saône) with 142 communes. The population of the arrondissement was 156,331 in 2016.  
 Arrondissement of Charolles, (subprefecture: Charolles) with 126 communes. The population of the arrondissement was 87,416 in 2016.  
 Arrondissement of Louhans, (subprefecture: Louhans) with 88 communes. The population of the arrondissement was 67,030 in 2016.  
 Arrondissement of Mâcon, (prefecture of the Saône-et-Loire department: Mâcon) with 120 communes. The population of the arrondissement was 112,854 in 2016.

History

In 1800 the arrondissements of Mâcon, Autun, Chalon-sur-Saône, Charolles and Louhans were established. The arrondissement of Louhans was disbanded in 1926, and restored in 1942. 

The borders of the arrondissements of Saône-et-Loire were modified in January 2017:
 six communes from the arrondissement of Autun to the arrondissement of Chalon-sur-Saône
 seven commune from the arrondissement of Autun to the arrondissement of Charolles
 14 communes from the arrondissement of Chalon-sur-Saône to the arrondissement of Autun
 seven communes from the arrondissement of Chalon-sur-Saône to the arrondissement of Louhans
 one commune from the arrondissement of Chalon-sur-Saône to the arrondissement of Mâcon
 five communes from the arrondissement of Charolles to the arrondissement of Autun
 one commune from the arrondissement of Charolles to the arrondissement of Chalon-sur-Saône
 10 communes from the arrondissement of Charolles to the arrondissement of Mâcon
 eight communes from the arrondissement of Mâcon to the arrondissement of Chalon-sur-Saône
 two communes from the arrondissement of Mâcon to the arrondissement of Louhans

References

Saone-et-Loire